Tariq Altaf (1946–2001) was a diplomat of the government of Pakistan.

History

Tariq Altaf served as Pakistan's ambassador to Sri Lanka from June 28, 1993 to 2000.  He then served as High Commissioner to Canada until September 21, 2001 when he died as a result of a car crash.

He was heading home in a chauffeured car on Sussex Drive in Ottawa, when it collided with a vehicle driven by a seventeen-year-old male, pushing both vehicles into oncoming traffic.  The teenager was charged in October, 2001 with careless driving and driving with improper tires.  Pakistani officials expressed satisfaction with the charges.

References

High Commissioners of Pakistan to Sri Lanka
High Commissioners of Pakistan to Canada
Road incident deaths in Canada
1946 births
2001 deaths